James Henry Duncan (September 25, 1887 – January 21, 1955) was an American discus thrower who won a bronze medal at the 1912 Summer Olympics. During World War I he rose to the rank of Lieutenant in the U.S. Army.

World record
Duncan was the first holder of the official world discus record. On May 26, 1912, he hurled the discus with his right hand 156 feet 1¾ inches (47.59) at the Irish American Athletic Club's track & field, Celtic Park in Queens, New York. On the same day, he hurled the discus 96 feet 7.5 inches, with his left hand, breaking the world's record for right and left hands combined with a distance of 252 feet 8 and 7/8 inches. This throw was recognized by the IAAF when they issued their inaugural list of records in 1912.

Military career
Duncan was a Lieutenant in the U.S. Army, Expeditionary Forces during World War I. He was attached to the 11th Company of Engineers. He served in five offensive and one defensive sectors. After his discharge from the U.S. Army, he stayed in France, married a French woman and opened a gymnasium in Paris. He was also the caretaker and manager of the American Military Cemetery at Suresnes, near Paris and corresponded with many American mothers, informing them of his visits to their sons graves.

In 1920, he was offered the position of trainer for the French Olympic athletes training for the 1920 Olympic Games in Antwerp. In 1927, his 3-year-old daughter, Jacqueline Duncan won a beauty competition, being voted "the healthiest and most beautiful child of more than 30,000 who entered a competition organized by one of the leading Paris newspapers."

Duncan was critically injured in 1932, when in an apparent suicide attempt, he shot himself three times, with two bullets lodging in his abdomen. He was in France. He died on January 21, 1955.

References

Further reading

1887 births
1955 deaths
United States Army personnel of World War I
American male discus throwers
Athletes (track and field) at the 1912 Summer Olympics
World record setters in athletics (track and field)
Olympic bronze medalists for the United States in track and field
Medalists at the 1912 Summer Olympics